Samuel Shearer (born 29 December 1883) was a Scottish footballer who played at inside-forward for Southampton and Bradford Park Avenue in the early 20th century.

Football career
Shearer was born in Coylton in South Ayrshire and started his football career in Scottish Junior Football with Trabboch before being invited for a trial at Southampton in the summer of 1908. He showed "considerable promise" in the trial matches and was rewarded with a professional contract.

He made his debut for the "Saints" in the opening match of the 1908–09 Southern League season, a 3–1 draw at Brighton, but after four appearances, he lost his place to Frank Jordan in mid-September. Described as "naturally skillful", Shearer was able to keep the ball close to his feet and as a result incurred regular kicks and bruises to his ankles, but his individuality was never properly exploited by his team-mates. For the remainder of the season, Shearer was in-and-out of the side making a total of eleven appearances, mainly at inside-left, but also at inside-right and on the left wing.

In the summer of 1909, Saints signed Sam Brittleton who took over at inside-left, before losing out in turn to Bob Carter. Shearer was then third-choice for the inside-left berth, and it was only in the last month of the season that he made a sustained run in the side with five first-team appearances.

He returned to Scotland in the summer of 1910 to join Nithsdale Wanderers of Dumfries, before returning to England with Bradford Park Avenue in December 1912. After making only one league appearance for Bradford, Shearer retired in 1913.

References

1883 births
Footballers from South Ayrshire
Scottish footballers
Association football forwards
Nithsdale Wanderers F.C. players
Southampton F.C. players
Bradford (Park Avenue) A.F.C. players
English Football League players
Southern Football League players
1971 deaths